Frank Hughes (11 March 1909 – 30 April 2002) was  a former Australian rules footballer who played with Footscray in the Victorian Football League (VFL).

Notes

External links 
		

1909 births
2002 deaths
Australian rules footballers from Victoria (Australia)
Western Bulldogs players